Hot R&B/Hip-Hop Songs is a chart published by Billboard that ranks the top-performing songs in the United States in African-American-oriented musical genres; the chart has undergone various name changes since its launch in 1942 to reflect the evolution of such genres.  In 1973, it was published under the title Best Selling Soul Singles through the issue of Billboard dated July 7 and Hot Soul Singles thereafter.  During that year, 22 different singles topped the chart, based on playlists submitted by radio stations and surveys of retail sales outlets.

Stevie Wonder had both the first and last number ones of 1973.  In the issue of Billboard dated January 6, Wonder's song "Superstition" reached number one, displacing the final chart-topper of 1972, "Me and Mrs. Jones" by Billy Paul.  Wonder returned to number one for a single week in September with "Higher Ground" and gained his third chart-topper of the year when "Living for the City" reached the top spot in the issue dated December 29.  This made Wonder the only act to achieve three number ones in 1973.  Gladys Knight & the Pips and the Spinners each had two chart-topping singles during the year.  With a cumulative total of eight weeks, Knight and her group had the highest total number of weeks atop the chart of any act.  The year's longest unbroken run at number was achieved by Marvin Gaye, who spent six consecutive weeks in the peak position with "Let's Get It On".

Several acts gained the first number ones of their careers in 1973, beginning with Timmy Thomas, who displaced Stevie Wonder from the top spot in late January with "Why Can't We Live Together".  In May and June, three consecutive chart-toppers were debut number ones for their respective artists, the Ohio Players, the Independents and Barry White.  The J.B.'s, the backing band for singer James Brown, reached number one in their own right for the first time in July with "Doing It to Death".  Trombonist and musical director Fred Wesley received a featured credit on the single; James Brown himself appeared on the track but was not credited.   Three months later, Eddie Kendricks gained his first number one as a solo artist with "Keep on Truckin'"; Kendricks had left the Temptations in 1971 after achieving several number ones as a member of the group.  In addition to the various acts topping the chart for the first time, Sylvia made her first appearance at number one since Billboard launched a combined sales and airplay chart for black music; her last chart-topper had been on the Most Played R&B by Jockeys listing as half of the duo Mickey & Sylvia in 1957.

Chart history

See also
 1973 in music
 List of Billboard Hot 100 number-one singles of 1973

References

1973
1973 record charts
1973 in American music